The Blue Mountain Gazette was a newspaper launched in Katoomba, New South Wales, Australia, in January 1903.

History
In January 1903 The Blue Mountain Gazette was launched by E. D. Wilson, who set up his business on Main Street, Katoomba. Twelve months later, in January 1904, Wilson sold his interest in the paper to Robert Gornall. Gornall sold to John Knight of The Mountaineer in December 1904 and transferred his printing plant "to a prosperous and rapidly rising mining and agricultural town in the north, where there is no newspaper". The Gazette, which had circulated throughout the Blue Mountains and adjoining areas, was incorporated with The Mountaineer.

Digitisation
The Blue Mountain Gazette has been digitised as part of the Australian Newspapers Digitisation Program project of the National Library of Australia.

See also
List of newspapers in New South Wales
List of newspapers in Australia

References

External links
 

Defunct newspapers published in Katoomba, New South Wales
Newspapers on Trove